Bashir Mason (born February 11, 1984) is an American college basketball coach and current head men's basketball coach at Saint Peter's University.

He was previously an assistant coach at Marist College in 2008, and an assistant coach at Wagner College in 2010.

Mason played high school basketball St. Benedict's Preparatory School, then joined then head coach Bruiser Flint to play college basketball at Drexel University. He was a four-year starter for the Dragons, scoring over 1,000 points and handing out 471 assists as a point guard. He was a CAA all-defensive player every season, as well as the CAA's defensive player of the year as a freshman.

Mason was hired by Wagner, in March 2012, as their 18th men's head basketball coach. At the time of his hiring, Mason was the youngest coach in NCAA Division I Basketball at 28. He guided Wagner to three regular season titles, as well as their first-ever postseason win, defeating St. Bonaventure in the 2016 National Invitation Tournament. He finished his ten seasons at Wagner with a 165–130 record.

Mason was hired as Saint Peter's 16th men's head basketball coach on April 12, 2022. He replaced Shaheen Holloway when he left Saint Peter's for Seton Hall on March 30, 2022.

Head coaching record

References

External links
Saint Peter's bio

1984 births
Living people
Basketball coaches from New Jersey
Basketball players from Jersey City, New Jersey
College men's basketball head coaches in the United States
Drexel Dragons men's basketball players
Marist Red Foxes men's basketball coaches
Point guards
Saint Peter's Peacocks men's basketball coaches
Wagner Seahawks men's basketball coaches